Ryan Vena (born November 15, 1977) is a former arena football quarterback. Vena attended Colgate University in Hamilton, New York and graduated in 2000.  Vena started his career in arena football in 2002. He ended his career with over 720 career passing touchdowns. His best years were with the Wilkes-Barre/Scranton Pioneers. He finished his career with the Philadelphia Soul in 2011.

College career
Vena received several college athletic scholarships upon his graduation from Chatfield Senior High School in Littleton, Colorado, and Colgate University was where he ended up.

Vena was named to 4 straight All-Patriot League 1st team All-conference selections, and was the 1st and only 3 time Patriot League MVP.

Ryan finished his career as the Colgate and Patriot League's all-time leader in total offense with 9,435 yards. He was the first Patriot League quarterback to pass for over 7,000 yards and rush for over 2,000.

The holder of 13 Colgate records in total offense and passing, he led Colgate to three straight appearances in the NCAA Division I-AA playoffs, and four straight winning seasons.

Ryan was named to the 15th and 25th Anniversary All-Patriot League Teams as the only quarterback selected.  And in 2008, Ryan was added to Colgate University Athletics Hall of Honor.

Professional career

af2
In 2002, Vena began his arena football career in the af2, playing for the Albany Conquest for two seasons and a third season in 2006.  Vena had his most success playing for the Wilkes-Barre/Scranton Pioneers of the af2 from 2007 to 2009. During that time, the Pioneers played in ArenaCup VIII and ArenaCup X, and was named the MVP of ArenaCup VIII. During the regular season, the Pioneers went 41–7 while Vena was at the helm. In 2007, Vena was named Offensive Player of the Year and the MVP of the ArenaCup.

Columbus Destroyers
Vena began his AFL career with the Columbus Destroyers in 2004. Vena was the Destroyers primary quarterback, throwing 3,081 passes, 57 touchdowns, and 10 interceptions, Columbus finished the season 6–10. In 2005, he returned and competed with Matt D'Orazio all season long for the starting quarterback position.

Iowa Barnstormers
When the Arena Football League returned in 2010, Vena was a member of the Iowa Barnstormers. The Barnstormers began the year with Brian Villanueva. But in the first game of the year against the Chicago Rush, Villanueva threw three interceptions without a touchdown, and Vena came in as a replacement. He started the rest of the season, throwing 3,924 yards, 78 touchdowns, and 22 rushing touchdowns.

Philadelphia Soul
In 2011, Vena moved to the Philadelphia Soul and began the year as the backup behind Justin Allgood. But after the Soul started the year 1–3, Vena replaced Allgood as the team's starter, and finished out the season and broke the record for most rushing touchdowns in a season by a quarterback at the time, with 23.

AFL statistics

Stats from ArenaFan:

References

1977 births
Living people
Albany Conquest players
American football quarterbacks
Colgate Raiders football players
Columbus Destroyers players
Iowa Barnstormers players
People from Red Bank, New Jersey
Philadelphia Soul players
Players of American football from New Jersey
Sportspeople from Monmouth County, New Jersey
Wilkes-Barre/Scranton Pioneers players